Champ de courses d'Enghien is a railway station in the commune of Soisy-sous-Montmorency (Val-d'Oise department), France. The station is served by Transilien H trains, on the lines from Paris to Persan-Beaumont and Pontoise. The daily number of passengers was between 2,500 and 7,500 in 2002. The station has two free parking sections with 433 spaces in total. The station is served every 15 minutes. It takes 15 to 19 minutes to reach Paris.

History

Champ de courses d'Enghien is located on the original Paris – Lille line, opened on 20 June 1846 by Compagnie des chemins de fer du Nord (Nord Railway Company).  This line passed along the Montmorency Valley (Ermont-Eaubonne), and headed towards the Northeast at Saint-Ouen-l'Aumône, continuing through the Oise valley. In 1859, a more direct line along Chantilly was opened. The line Paris – Pontoise was electrified in 1969.

See also
List of SNCF stations in Île-de-France

References

External links

 

Railway stations in Val-d'Oise
Railway stations in France opened in 1880